Petrušnja Vas is a village just north of Šentvid pri Stični in the Municipality  of Ivančna Gorica in central Slovenia. The area is part of the historical region of Lower Carniola. The municipality is now included in the Central Slovenia Statistical Region.

Church
The local church is dedicated to Saint Nicholas and belongs to the Parish of Šentvid pri Stični. It was first mentioned in written documents dating to 1250 and was restyled in the Baroque in the 17th century.

Notable people
Notable people that were born or lived in Petrušnja Vas include:
Jožef Jerič (1823–188), beekeeper, born in the hamlet of Gradišče

References

External links
Petrušnja Vas on Geopedia

Populated places in the Municipality of Ivančna Gorica